The following is a list of episodes for the Australian television programme, Adam Hills Tonight. The show was known as Adam Hills in Gordon Street Tonight for the first two series.

, 24 original episodes of Adam Hills in Gordon Street Tonight and 12 episodes of Adam Hills Tonight have aired.

Series overview
{| class="wikitable" style="text-align:center"
|-
! style="padding:0 8px;" colspan="2" rowspan="2"| Season
! style="padding:0 8px;" rowspan="2"| Episodes
! colspan="2"| Originally aired
! colspan="3"| DVD release dates
|-
! style="padding:0 8px;"| Season premiere
! style="padding:0 8px;"| Season finale
! style="padding:0 8px;"| Region 1
! style="padding:0 8px;"| Region 2
! style="padding:0 8px;"| Region 4
|- 
|  style="width:13px; background:#2b5225;"|
 |1
 |12
 |align="center" width="130"|
 |align="center" width="130"|
 |
 |
 |
|- 
|  style="width:13px; background:#6e1c1d;"|
 |2
 |12
 |align="center" width="130"|
 |align="center" width="130"|
 |
 |
 |
|- 
|  style="width:13px; background:#4682B4;"|
 |3
 |12
 |align="center" width="130"|
 |align="center" width="130"|
 |
 |
 |
|}

Episodes

Season 1 (2011)

Season 2 (2012)

Season 3 (2013)

References

Adam Hills in Gordon Street Tonight
Adam Hills in Gordon Street Tonight
Adam Hills in Gordon Street Tonight